A kiddie ride is a child-sized, themed, mildly interactive coin-operated ride that can be ridden by young children for amusement. Kiddie rides are commonly available in amusement parks, arcades, malls, hotel game rooms, outside supermarkets, and large department stores. Less commonly, they may also appear in other venues such as restaurants, food courts, grocery shops, and auto dealerships. When activated by a coin, a kiddie ride entertains the rider for a short time with a mild motion that replicates the theme of the ride. Most rides also include sounds and music. Some even feature flashing lights, pedals, and/or buttons. Commercial kiddie rides are often very colorful with an animal, vehicle, or popular cartoon character theme which appeals to children. They are usually driven by a heavy-duty electric motor, which is usually disguised inside or underneath the metal, fiberglass, or vacuum formed plastic body of the ride.

History 
The kiddie ride was first invented in 1930 by James Otto Hahs of Sikeston, Missouri. Originally called the Hahs Gaited Mechanical Horse, the ride was originally conceived as a Christmas present for his children. However, Hahs soon realized the money-making potential and set about commercializing it. Initially, he used wooden horses, not unlike those found on a carousel, and commissioned carousel makers to make the horses. However, he found these horses to be too heavy and decided that aluminum would be a more suitable material. When told it couldn't be done, however, Hahs went ahead and invented a process to form horses out of metal. The rides would be manufactured at Hahs Machine Works in Sikeston, and they were recognized as the most original invention of the year in 1932. In 1933, Hahs struck a deal with Exhibit Supply Company to distribute his horses, with a 5% cut going to Hahs. When the patent on the ride eventually ran out, he retired from the wealth he had amassed from sales. In 1953, Billboard magazine called it "1953's fastest growing business". Years later, aluminum horses would be replaced by fiberglass.

Developed around the same time, the Link Trainer was initially intended for use as a coin-operated entertainment device as well as a tool for training pilots.

Music 

Many very old rides do not feature music; also, some vehicle rides may favor engine sounds instead of music. However, on rides that feature music, early rides (and cheaper modern rides that imitate more well-known rides) are equipped with simple integrated circuits that continually playback one melody or repeat a set of melodies in sequence. These have evolved in the sense that the earliest musically-enabled rides played back only a single monophonic melody repetitively. In contrast, later ones played multiple polyphonic melodies whilst sometimes including short sound or speech samples. Later rides could also use a tape deck, while more recent rides may have a solid-state audio playback device akin to flash-based MP3 players. Usually, the music chosen is generic children's songs, while on licensed rides, the theme song for the licensed character would be used. However, in rare cases, some rides play traditional pop music, and for private rides, the owner may request a song that has personal relevance to be programmed into the ride.

Many modern rides are programmed to play multiple melodies, with the music changing each time the ride is used, the logic being to prolong the interest of the child on the ride. However, some modern rides, in particular licensed character ones, are usually programmed to play a single melody or song, which is usually the theme song of the character's television show or film. There are also some exceptions where there are licensed rides playing totally unrelated pieces of music or non-licensed rides that play only one particular tune, for example, a song about cars on a car-themed ride, the Thomas theme tune on a Thomas the Tank Engine ride, the Postman Pat theme tune on a Postman Pat ride and the Fireman Sam theme tune on a Fireman Sam ride.

Certain rides exist that do not emphasize music but play a running narration or tell a story instead. They usually have generic instrumental music running softly in the background while the story is being told.

Modern rides 

Newer, more advanced rides do not usually start as soon as coins are inserted; instead they prompt the rider, parent or guardian to press a start button, so as to allow the rider to seat him/herself comfortably before starting the ride. Often, these rides will also play a message before movement begins and may also play an ending message once the ride ends, to let the rider know that it is safe to disembark.

Other safety precautions commonly found in more advanced rides include:
allowing use of the start button to pause the ride, so the rider can reposition themselves or even disembark safely if desired;
safety sensors that detect if anything is potentially obstructing the ride's movement and stop the ride accordingly until the obstruction is removed;
overload sensors that stop the ride from moving if the weight limit on the ride is exceeded;
a slow start/stop action so as not to shock or frighten younger riders.

To attract attention, most rides occasionally flash their lights or play a sound, or both, at set intervals, although many older rides, as well as low-cost, or knockoff, rides do not have an attract mode.

Some rides may, as mentioned above, narrate a story through sound or using a video monitor, the latter providing limited interaction with the video displayed.

Common themes 

 Arthur
Batmobile Barney the Dinosaur
Bear in the Big Blue House
Boat 
 Brum
Bumble Bee
Bunny / Rabbit
Bus 
Campervan (Introduced by the TV programme Sooty & Co.)
 Cifford the Big Red Dog (Introduced by the TV Program Clifford the Big Red Dog)
Digger (Introduced by the TV programme Bob the Builder as Scoop)
Dinosaur (Dino from The Flintstones or not)
Dog
Dolphin
Elephant
Fire truck
 Garfield
Helicopter
Horse or pony - Perhaps the most popular kiddie ride.
Ice cream truck
Jay Jay the Jet Plane
Jeep
Jumbo jet or other airplane
Ladybug or Caterpillar
Larrymobile
Mickey Mouse
Miniature carousel
Motorcycle
Muppet Babies
My Little Pony
Panda (usually in the form of a small ship with a panda sitting facing the rider)
Peacock
Police car
Police motorcycle
Post van (introduced by the TV programme Postman Pat)
Roller coaster
Sailor Moon
School bus
Sesame Street
Space Shuttle
SpongeBob SquarePants
Sports car
Stagecoach
Steam Roller (Introduced by the TV programme Bob the Builder as Roley)
Swan
Taxi
Teletubbies
Thomas & Friends
Tractor
Train (usually stationary and not on a track, but train kiddie rides that move on a small track do exist)

Types of rides

Track rides 

Track rides are usually rides in the form of a train on a track; in most coin-operated train-type track rides, the coin mechanism is on the locomotive unit of the ride and it can seat two to three toddlers. In general, the ride is powered by a low-voltage current passing through the tracks but sometimes the rides are powered by batteries. Most versions of these rides are specifically designed to carry young children, due to the low-voltage used and the size of the ride, although it is possible to find bigger models designed for older children.

Track rides are not necessarily restricted to trains; animal track rides that feature horses or frogs have also been documented. In a similar fashion, another type of ride that would classify as a track ride would be one with an elongated base where the figure paces the length of the base, then turns and moves in the opposite direction on reaching its limit.

Carousel rides 

Another common type of kiddie ride is the miniature carousel type. These rides are usually in the form of a small-sized carousel and newer models have the coin-box on the main pillar whereas older units have the coin box on a pole sticking out of the side of the ride.

Carousel rides featuring licensed characters (see below) are not common, but do exist. A Thomas the Tank Engine carousel ride is known to exist, as is one from a British television show for children called Play School. Carousel rides featuring the characters from The Wiggles, Bob the Builder, Sesame Street and Hi-5 have also been documented.

Hydraulic rides 
More commonly built by European kiddie ride manufacturers like Automatic Toys Modena (ATM) from Italy, hydraulic rides are kiddie rides situated on a hydraulic arm that raise and lower the ride during their activation. Usually, the rider is given limited interaction with the ride in the form of up/down buttons or levers so that the rider can instruct the ride to fly higher or lower, giving the user the impression of some control over their experience.

Base rides 

This kind of ride is perhaps the most common type, an animal or vehicle situated on a vacuum-formed base that moves up-and-down or side-to-side, or even both, when activated; some even move in a slithering-like motion. Usually, rides of this configuration have the motor hidden in the base, although some larger rides have the motor hidden in the ride-on figure instead.

One of the most popular rides is a horse ride. Recent developments have included the "Pony Express" ride, first manufactured by Italian company Cogan. These feature a complicated mechanism that alternates between galloping and trotting motions during the ride, mimicking the movements of a real-life horse. This type of ride has become very popular, that this base has been adapted by both the Spanish manufacturer Falgas for their own version of the "Pony Express" and Memo Park, another Italian based company, for their own type of Western style horse. Both companies have added unique features to the original Cogan version of the ride, Falgas adds horse sounds to the soundtrack whilst a more innovative function on the Memo Park version is the use of rider interactivity, in where if the rider pulls back on the reins, the horse stops for a few seconds before continuing to either gallop or trot depending at what pace it is travelling at when the reins are pulled.

Another one of the most popular rides is the Kiddie Coaster. First manufactured by Amutec in 2000 and in 2002 by ICE, this ride simulates one of two different roller coasters. The ICE version simulates Blue Streak and Gemini while the Amutec version simulates two different Six Flags coasters. The ICE version is one of the most common kiddie rides that can be found in malls and shopping outlets.

Free movement (bumper car-like) rides 
These kinds of rides are usually in the form of animals or vehicles. These are most common in Asia, particularly China. Unlike a real bumper car ride commonly found at funfairs, the coin-operated variant uses batteries instead of drawing electricity off of an overhead mesh, and one can ride it anytime, instead of having to wait for the operator to start the ride for them.

Teeter totter rides 
These rides are generally teeter totters for one person. An inanimate figure typically sits at the opposite end of the ride. The rides moves on a gentle up-and-down motion mimicking that of a standard teeter-totter. Jolly Roger Rides has made three of these: one featuring Mr. Bump from The Mr. Men Show, one featuring the Pink Panther and one featuring Mr. Blobby.

Video game hybrids 
These rides are a hybrid of kiddie ride and arcade video games. The rides usually incorporate a video display and, while the motion is synchronized to the events happening on the screen, the ride will start and end following the events on the screen. The ride is usually interactive and there are push-buttons to allow the rider to interact with the on-screen actions.

These rides should not be mistaken for simulators, which reproduce the action of a video game without offering further interactivity. Furthermore, the video-game hybrid is time-based and ends at a pre-determined time, regardless of the actions of the user.
An example of a hybrid ride would be the Waku Waku Sonic Patrol Car ride and other waku-waku and wanpaku series of rides released by Sega Japan. Another example is a Mario Kart ride manufactured by OMC Electronics Ltd. of Tewkesbury, Gloucestershire and licensed to Nintendo which features Mario climbing on the back of the kid's seat and plays the DIC Super Mario World theme song when it is ridden.

Character rides 
In many cases, kiddie rides in the likes of well-known copyrighted characters or objects from films or television shows can also be found, usually at bigger shopping malls that can afford them due to the higher purchasing costs. A classic example would be the Batmobile ride mentioned earlier. One model looks like a miniature Batmobile on a stand, and occasionally flashes lights and plays a short tune from a Batman movie at set intervals, Another manufactured by Jolly Roger Ltd, a Garfield car ride, which includes Garfield wearing a hat and sitting on the car with car horn sound.

Another example of a character kiddie ride would be a Clifford the Big Red Dog kiddie ride, manufactured by Jolly Roger Ltd of the United Kingdom and licensed by Scholastic UK. The ride costs around US$5000 purchased new. It talks in a girl's voice (presumably the voice of Emily Elizabeth) and plays the theme song from the PBS Kids TV series when in motion. A button to make
Clifford bark also exists on the ride. 

A Teletubbies Tubbytronic Super Dome ride was manufactured by Amutec of Mablethorpe. It features Tinky-Winky, Dipsy, Laa-Laa & Po on a hill and has 16 Tubbytronic sounds (made in 1999) (another version has Noo-Noo with two phrases) Dipsy has got his hat and a rabbit stands on the hill, Jolly Roger Ltd made a carousel, it features the Teletubbies, plays the theme song, and a push button to hear Teletubbies sounds. 

Another is a Bob the Builder ride, which features Bob climbing onto Scoop with 4 sounds (made in 1998) (another version has got Roley with 3 phrases (made in 2003), the Scoop version has Pilchard in his shovel). 

Merkur Kids, a German manufacturer has made a Cars ride where it features Lightning McQueen with brake and accelerate pedals, a green button (does a horn) and a yellow button to hear Luigi say "You are a famous race car, a real race car", while they also made another Lightning McQueen ride but in Dinoco, and Mater. 

In 2015, Northern Leisure Kiddy Rides UK manufactured a SpongeBob SquarePants kiddie ride based on the Krabby Patty Wagon from The SpongeBob SquarePants Movie (released in 2004). This ride has SpongeBob seated next to the "rider's seat", and his pet snail Gary rides on the back of the model. This SpongeBob-themed ride also includes a screen displaying the lyrics to the SpongeBob SquarePants theme song. The words to the theme don't play, instead they have to be sung out by whoever rides it (this is known as sing-along). The attract mode is also the SpongeBob theme, and each of the 3 buttons on the ride plays a sound effect: a horn, bubble noises (that are commonly used in transitions from a scene to another in SpongeBob), and a dolphin noise. 

R.G. Mitchell made a Thomas the Tank Engine kiddie ride with 4 push buttons which do "You're a really useful engine!" (Thomas: blue), "I need you to help the other engines" (Sir Topham Hatt: yellow), a whistle sound (James: red) and a steam sound (Percy: green). There is also a mini version of the aforementioned ride for places that don't have enough space. Jolly Roger Rides of the UK also made him as another ride, also with a video available, plays the theme tune, and a red push button to blow Thomas' whistle. 

A Barney & Friends ride was manufactured by Fun2Learn. This features Barney sitting on a train and has 7 push button sounds "A is for Alphabet! Let's sing it together! A-B-C-D-E-F-G, H-I-J-K-L-M-N-O-P, Q-R-S, T-U-V, W-X, Y-&-Z" (A is for Alphabet:) "Hi there, I'm Barney, what's your name?" (B is for Barney:) "Choo Choo!" (C is for Choo Choo, The sounds on this train:) a whistle sound (1 whistle:) "Tickets please, Tickets please!" (2 tickets:) a bell sound (3 bells:). In 2003, Taiwan electronics supplier Eletech Enterprise added an audio file of Barney’s “I Love You” song, performed by an unknown singer, to their extensive kiddie ride sound library. Since then, many units of this ride that were released in the US were refitted with Eletech boards, usually EM2021. Another Barney Tractor ride, plays Old Macdonald Had a Farm, and has a red push button to hear Barney. 

Jolly Roger Ltd. is also known for making other licensed kiddie rides, including: a fire truck and an airplane featuring Woody Woodpecker and Chilly Willy, a seesaw, train and police van featuring the Pink Panther and Inspector Clouseau, and a sailboat featuring Popeye.

Another example would be a Superman kiddie ride featuring the Man of Steel "stopping" the train you're in (meant to look like it's emerging from a tunnel into a rockfall.) When in motion, it plays the Superman: The Animated Series theme (in a lower pitch, the PAL version) and has four buttons: "Look! Up in the sky! It's a bird... it's a plane... it's Superman!!" "Superman! Faster than a speeding bullet!" "Superman! More powerful than a locomotive!" "Superman! Able to leap tall buildings in a single bound!" (these are all taken from the Superman radio show, but voiced by Don Kennedy.) Like the above examples, it was manufactured by Jolly Roger.

Kiddie's Inc. made a Dino kiddie ride which plays a slightly higher pitched audio file of "Meet The Flintstones" when the ride is in motion. It is probably one of the most common character rides. In the mid-late 1990s, Taiwan electronics supplier Eletech Enterprise had a different audio file of the theme song taken from the 3rd season of the TV series, on later units of this ride that usually had the DM2030-D board. In 2003, Eletech Enterprise added another different audio file of the theme song to their extensive kiddie ride sound library for this ride, taken from a classic TV show theme song album released by a generic record company, where two buttons can be pressed for a horn sound or Fred Flintstone saying, "Yabba-Dabba-Doo!". Many units refitted with the EM2001 or EM2021 boards are refurbished models by German kiddie ride manufacturer Merkur Kids, successor to Electro Mobil-Technik. In the UK, the ride was distributed by Northern Leisure Kiddy Rides UK. UK-distributed units had the original boards replaced with ones supplied by Stamar Electronics.

Character rides costs much more than generic rides when purchased new. The higher cost stems from the royalty of the voice samples and theme song as well as character licensing fees.

Knockoff rides that feature figures that look like those of famous cartoon characters exist. Commonly knocked off characters include: Pikachu from Pokémon, Disney's Donald Duck and Mickey Mouse, Despicable Me'''s Minions and Hello Kitty. They are cheaper than real licensed rides, and are found at smaller establishments. However, as the name suggests, they are not licensed, and in certain areas with high intellectual property rights recognition, purchasers of knockoff rides can potentially get themselves entangled with legal complications. Furthermore, the ride figure might not be designed to look as close to a licensed character compared to genuinely licensed rides, possibly resulting in diminished recognition. Occasionally, there are some countries where knockoff characters are found in fairground rides. These feature paint jobs of popular characters that are featured on the rides without a license from their respective owners. Some vehicles in said rides can also be based on popular cartoon characters, including Disney's Mickey Mouse and Goofy, Looney Tunes' Bugs Bunny, the Teenage Mutant Ninja Turtles and Bart Simpson from The Simpsons.

 Kiddie rides and personal use 
While kiddie rides are primarily used to garner extra income for commercial areas like shopping malls, supermarkets and amusement centers, like classic arcade game machines they are becoming increasingly common in homes in many developed countries, usually bought by game collectors and families. This renaissance is being led by Denver-based Kiddie Rides USA, and has received coverage in many magazines including Time, Fortune, United Airline's Hemispheres, and on CNBC.

Many of the rides are ex-location units which have been written off by the original owner, usually to make way for newer games or rides, and bought for a fraction of what they would cost brand new, either directly from the previous owner or on online auction sites like eBay.

 Free play 
Usually, older rides would be slightly modified; the coin mechanism is replaced by a push button switch to allow for free play, while more sophisticated rides that have a mode switch would be set permanently to free play.

 References 

External links
"Rise and Fall of the American Kiddie Ride"- Jake Swearingen, The Atlantic, Dec.2014.

 "Remember vintage coin-operated rides?" Click Americana'', Jan. 1953.
 

Amusement rides
Amusement rides by type